Bruce Elder may refer to:

 Bruce Elder (journalist), Australian journalist, writer and commentator
 Bruce Elder (basketball), basketball player
 R. Bruce Elder (born 1947), Canadian filmmaker and critic